Valentín Abecia Ayllón (6 February 1846 – 10 January 1910) was a Bolivian physician, historian, journalist and politician who served as the 16th vice president of Bolivia from 1904 to 1909. He served as second vice president alongside first vice president Eliodoro Villazón during the first administration of Ismael Montes.

References 

1846 births
1910 deaths
Liberal Party (Bolivia) politicians
Vice presidents of Bolivia